Spandau may refer to:

Places
Spandau, a district of Berlin, Germany
Spandau (locality), a locality of Berlin in the Spandau district
Berlin-Spandau – Charlottenburg North, an electoral district
Spandau Prison
Spandau arsenal, developing infantry weapons for Imperial Germany from 1850 to 1919

Other meanings
Spandau Ballet, a British 1980s pop group
Spandau Citadel, a renaissance fortress in Berlin
Berlin-Spandau station, a railway station in Berlin
Maschinengewehr 08, also known as Spandau, a standard World War I German Army machine gun
MG 34, a World War II German machine gun as referred to by the British
MG 42, a World War II German machine gun as referred to by the British